This is a complete list of football (soccer) players from Azerbaijan.

The comprehensive listing of the players is according to citizenship and registration in the database of the Association of Football Federations of Azerbaijan.

A
 Elgun Abbasli
 Asif Abbasov
 Aykhan Abbasov
 Ramazan Abbasov
 Samir Abbasov
 Urfan Abbasov
 Yasin Abbasov
 Araz Abdullayev
 Asgar Abdullayev
 Elnur Abdullayev
 Elshan Abdullayev
 Rashad Abdullayev
 Elnur Abdulov
 Samir Abdulov
 Ilgar Abdurakhmanov
 Rasim Abishov
 Ruslan Abishov
 Emin Agaev
 Amil Agajanov
 Kamran Agayev
 Murad Aghakishiyev
 Salahat Aghayev
 Haji Ahmadov
 Tarlan Ahmadov
 Huseyn Akhundov
 Samir Alakbarov
 Ahmad Alaskarov
 Elvin Aliyev
 Nazim Aliyev
 Orkhan Aliyev
 Pasha Aliyev
 Rauf Aliyev
 Samir Aliyev
 Elnur Allahverdiyev
 Emin Amiraslanov
 Rafael Amirbekov
 Rahid Amirguliyev
 Ruslan Amirjanov
 Arif Asadov

B
 Tofiq Bahramov
 Elmar Bakhshiev
 Kamal Bayramov
 Ufuk Budak

D
 Arif Dashdemirov
 Shahin Diniyev

G
 Deni Gaisumov
 Elshan Gambarov
 Gara Garayev
 Ibragim Gasanbekov
 Zaur Gashimov
 Vali Gasimov
 Igor Getman
 Ali Gökdemir
 Rufat Guliev
 Aziz Guliyev
 Eshgin Guliyev
 Farid Guliyev
 Ramin Guliyev
 Tarlan Guliyev
 Amit Guluzade
 Gurban Gurbanov
 Ilgar Gurbanov
 Ilyas Gurbanov
 Nijat Gurbanov
 Badavi Guseynov

H
 Aftandil Hajiyev
 Boyukagha Hajiyev
 Nizami Hajiyev
 Rahman Hajiyev
 Namiq Həsənov
 Orkhan Hasanov
 Jahangir Hasanzade
 Zaur Hashimov
 Javid Huseynov
 Murad Hüseynov
 Ramal Huseynov
 Saddam Huseynov
 Vurğun Hüseynov
 Yunis Huseynov

I
 Ruslan İdiqov
 Emin Imamaliev
 Javid Imamverdiyev
 Arif İsayev
 Tural Isgandarov
 Huseyn Isgandarov
 Afran Ismayilov
 Farrukh Ismayilov

J
 Emin Jafarguliyev
 Sevinj Jafarzade
 Tural Jalilov
 Vagif Javadov

K
 Rashad Karimov
 Aslan Kerimov 
 Kenan Kerimov
 Sahil Kerimov
 Shahriyar Khalilov
 Tarlan Khalilov
 Kurban Kurbanov

M
 Murad Megamadov
 Jamshid Maharramov
 Ruslan Majidov
 Rail Malikov
 Rail Melikov
 Alakbar Mammadov
 Aqil Mammadov
 Asif Mammadov
 Azer Mammadov
 Elvin Mammadov
 Elshan Mammadov
 Ismayil Mammadov
 Khagani Mammadov
 Nodar Mammadov
 Novruz Mammadov
 Ramiz Mammadov
 Fizuli Mammedov
 Emin Mehdiyev
 Rauf Mehdiyev
 Hüseyn Məhəmmədov
 Agaselim Mirjavadov
 Javad Mirzaev
 Orkhan Mirzaev
 Bəxtiyar Musaev
 Ruslan Musayev
 Samir Musayev

N
 Nadir Nabiev
 Agil Nabiyev
 Vüqar Nadirov
 Tural Narimanov
 Ramin Nasibov
 Anar Nazirov
 Aqil Nəbiyev
 Adehim Niftaiyev
 Nurlan Novruzov
 Tagim Novruzov

Ö
 Cihan Özkara

Q
 Ilkin Qirtimov
 Kazemır Qudiyev
 Emin Quliyev
 Kamal Quliyev
 Alim Qurbanov
 Mahmud Qurbanov

R
 Shahriyar Rahimov
 Rasim Ramaldanov
 Zaur Ramazanov
 Elhan Rasulov
 Vidadi Rzayev

S
 Rashad Sadiqov
 Rashad Sadygov
 Vagif Sadygov
 Orkhan Safiyaroglu
 Murad Sattarly
 Ramil Sayadov
 Mirhuseyn Seyidov
 Samadagha Shikhlarov
 Mahir Shukurov
 Nadir Shukurov
 Narvik Sirkhayev
 Bakhtiyar Soltanov
 Nazim Suleymanov
 Jeyhun Sultanov
 Elman Sultanov

T
 Akif Taghiyev
 Javid Tagiyev
 Ruslan Tagizade
 Zaur Tagizade 
 Kazbek Tuaev

U
 Rizvan Umarov
 Nduka Usim

V
 Farhad Veliyev

Y
 Ilham Yadullayev
 Eltun Yagublu
 Saşa Yunisoğlu
 Elvin Yunuszade
 Mikayil Yusifov
 Namiq Yusifov
 Ruhid Yusubov

Z
 Zeynal Zeynalov

See also
 Football in Azerbaijan
 Association of Football Federations of Azerbaijan
 Azerbaijan national football team
 Azerbaijan Premier League
 List of Azerbaijani wrestlers

References
 Association of Football Federations of Azerbaijan 

Lists of association football players by nationality
 
Footballers
Association football player non-biographical articles